Hervé Din Din (Arabic: هيرفي دين دين; born 17 April 1991 in Cameroon) is a Cameroonian retired footballer.

Career

After playing in the Cameroonian second division and the Vietnamese top flight, Din Din had an unsuccessful trial with Hungarian side Debreceni VSC. In 2011, he signed for JS Kabylie in Algeria as a springboard to Europe  but his contract was soon terminated because foreign players had to have represented their nation at youth level. After that, Din Din joined Tunisian top flight club US Monastir, where he made 2 league appearances.

In 2016, he signed for Tvøroyrar Bóltfelag in the Faroe Islands.

References

External links
 Hervé Din Din at Soccerway

Cameroonian footballers
Living people
Association football forwards
1991 births
US Monastir (football) players
Tvøroyrar Bóltfelag players